The John Hultquist House is a historic building located in Swedesburg, Iowa, United States.  Hultquist was a native of Småland in Sweden who immigrated to this country in 1880.  After working for the Chicago, Burlington and Quincy Railroad he began farming and he was eventually able to buy  of land for his own farm north of town.  In 1918 Hultquist employed C.K. Schantz to build this two story, frame, American Foursquare for he and his second wife Amanda after his retirement.  It was fairly common for the early Swedish immigrants in Wayne Township to relocate to Swedesburg after they retired from farming so as to maintain their Swedish traditions.  The house was listed on the National Register of Historic Places in 1999.  The historic designation also includes a small barn to the east of the house. The front gable structure originally housed horses, a cow and chickens.

References

Houses completed in 1918
American Foursquare architecture in Iowa
Swedesburg, Iowa
Houses in Henry County, Iowa
National Register of Historic Places in Henry County, Iowa
Houses on the National Register of Historic Places in Iowa